The 1913 Washington football team was an American football team that represented the University of Washington during the 1913 college football season.  In its sixth season under coach Gil Dobie, the team compiled a 7–0 record and outscored its opponents by a combined total of 266 to 20. Herman Anderson was the team captain.

Schedule

References

Washington
Washington Huskies football seasons
College football undefeated seasons
Washington football